Between 1993 and 2009, the European Union (EU) legally comprised three pillars. This structure was introduced with the Treaty of Maastricht on 1 November 1993, and was eventually abandoned on 1 December 2009 upon the entry into force of the Treaty of Lisbon, when the EU obtained a consolidated legal personality.
The European Communities pillar handled economic, social and environmental policies. It comprised the European Community (EC), the European Coal and Steel Community (ECSC, until its expiry in 2002), and the European Atomic Energy Community (EURATOM).
The Common Foreign and Security Policy (CFSP) pillar took care of foreign policy and military matters.
Police and Judicial Co-operation in Criminal Matters (PJCCM) brought together co-operation in the fight against crime. This pillar was originally named Justice and Home Affairs (JHA)

Overview
Within each pillar, a different balance was struck between the supranational and intergovernmental principles.

Supranationalism was strongest in the first pillar. Its function generally corresponded at first to the three European Communities (European Coal and Steel Community (ECSC), European Economic Community (EEC) and Euratom) whose organisational structure had already been unified in 1965–67, through the Merger Treaty. Later, through the Treaty of Maastricht the word "Economic" was removed from the EEC, so it became simply the EC. Then with the Treaty of Amsterdam additional areas would be transferred from the third pillar to the first. In 2002, the ECSC (which had a lifetime of 50 years) ceased to exist because the treaty which established it, the Treaty of Paris, had expired.

In the CFSP and PJCCM pillars the powers of the European Parliament, the Commission and European Court of Justice with respect to the Council were significantly limited, without however being altogether eliminated. The balance struck in the first pillar was frequently referred to as the "community method", since it was that used by the European Community.

Pillar I: European Communities (Community integration method)

European Community (EC)
Customs union and Single market
Common Agricultural Policy
Common Fisheries Policy
EU competition law
Economic and monetary union
EU citizenship
Education and Culture
Trans-European Networks
Consumer protection
Healthcare
Research (e.g. 7th Framework Programme)
Environmental law
Social policy
Asylum policy
Schengen treaty
Immigration policy

European Coal and Steel Community (ECSC, until 2002)
Coal and steel industry

European Atomic Energy Community (EURATOM)
Nuclear power

Pillar II: Common Foreign and Security Policy (Intergovernmental cooperation method)

Foreign policy
Human rights
Democracy
Foreign aid

Security policy
Common Security and Defence Policy
EU battle groups
Helsinki Headline Goal Force Catalogue
Peacekeeping

Pillar III: Police and Judicial Co-operation in Criminal Matters (Intergovernmental cooperation method) 
Drug trafficking and weapons smuggling
Terrorism
Trafficking in human beings
Organised Crime
Bribery and fraud

History

1993: Origin

The pillar structure had its historical origins in the negotiations leading up to the Maastricht Treaty. It was desired to add powers to the Community in the areas of foreign policy, security and defence policy, asylum and immigration policy, criminal co-operation, and judicial co-operation.

However, some member-states opposed the addition of these powers to the Community on the grounds that they were too sensitive to national sovereignty for the community method to be used, and that these matters were better handled intergovernmentally. To the extent that at that time the Community dealt with these matters at all, they were being handled intergovernmentally, principally in European Political Cooperation (EPC).

As a result, these additional matters were not included in the European Community; but were tacked on externally to the European Community in the form of two additional 'pillars'. The first additional pillar (Common Foreign and Security Policy, CFSP) dealt with foreign policy, security and defence issues, while the second additional pillar (JHA, Justice and Home Affairs), dealt with the remainder.

1999 and 2003: Amendments

Amendments by the treaty of Amsterdam and the treaty of Nice made the additional pillars increasingly supranational. Most important among these were the transfer of policy on asylum, migration and judicial co-operation in civil matters to the Community pillar, effected by the Amsterdam treaty. Thus the third pillar was renamed Police and Judicial Co-operation in Criminal Matters, or PJCCM. The term Justice and Home Affairs was still used to cover both the third pillar and the transferred areas.

2009: Abolition

In a speech before the Nice Conference, Joschka Fischer, then Foreign Minister of Germany, called for a simplification of the European Union. One of these core ideas was to abolish the pillar structure, and replace it with a merged legal personality for the Union. This idea was included in the Treaty of Lisbon, which entered into force on 1 December 2009. With a legal personality, Union is, for instance, able to be part of international treaties. The Treaty of Lisbon also states that "the Union shall replace and succeed the European Community," with the effect that, once the Treaty entered into force, the EU obtained the membership of the World Trade Organization (WTO) which had belonged to the European Communities pillar.

The abolition of the "3-pillar structure" was welcomed by practitioners and academics who had long considered the 'pillar metaphor" to be unrealistic, if not absurd.  The idea that one pillar could be the Communities, while the other two were merely "policies" or "cooperation" was scarcely credible.

In the Lisbon Treaty the distribution of competences in various policy areas between Member States and the Union was reorganised into the following scheme:

See also
 European Union law
 History of the European Union
 Lisbon Treaty abolishes (3) pillars: timeline/events, ( 1993-2009 history )

External links
The three pillars of the European Union European Navigator
A proposed evolution in the CFSP/defence pillar of the EU-WEU : The presentation of the Eurocorps-Foreign Legion concept at the European Parliament in June 2003

1993 establishments in the European Union
2009 disestablishments in the European Union
European Union constitutional law
History of the European Union